The Great Unknown  or Great Unknown  may refer to:

Film and television 
 The Great Unknown (1913 film), by Oscar A. C. Lund
 The Great Unknown (1924 film) (Die große Unbekannte), a German silent film directed by Willi Wolff
 The Great Unknown (1927 film) (Die große Unbekannte), a German silent film directed by Manfred Noa
 "The Great Unknown" (Key West), a television episode
 "The Great Unknown" (Rugrats), a television episode
 The Great Unknown: The Journey is Starting, an animated film directed by Jaiden Chivunga

Music

Albums 
 The Great Unknown (Logan album) or the title song, 2010
 The Great Unknown (Rob Thomas album) or the title song, 2015
 The Great Unknown (Sarah Geronimo album) or the title song (see below), 2015
 The Great Unknown, by Deanna Bogart, 1998
 The Great Unknown, by Koxbox, 2000

Songs 
 "The Great Unknown" (song), by Sarah Geronimo, 2016
 "The Great Unknown", by Anekdoten from A Time of Day
 "The Great Unknown", by Bob Evans from Suburban Songbook
 "The Great Unknown", by Dar Williams from The Honesty Room
 "The Great Unknown", by Disillusion from The Liberation
 "The Great Unknown", by Elvis Costello from Goodbye Cruel World
 "The Great Unknown", by Enter Shikari from Nothing Is True & Everything Is Possible
 "The Great Unknown", by Evermore from Real Life
 "The Great Unknown", by the Ghost Inside from Get What You Give
 "The Great Unknown", by Harry Manx from West Eats Meet
 "The Great Unknown", by Iron Maiden from The Book of Souls
 "The Great Unknown", by Jukebox the Ghost from Jukebox the Ghost
 "The Great Unknown", by Sara Evans from No Place That Far
 "The Great Unknown", by Travis, a B-side of the single "Closer"
 "Great Unknown", by Little River Band from Monsoon

Other uses
 The Great Unknown, a force venerated by some factions in Dungeons and Dragons
 Sir Walter Scott (1771–1832), British poet and novelist, was known by this name
 The Great Unknown, a comic series created by Jaiden Chivunga

See also
 The Unknown (disambiguation)